Yakuhananomia uenoi is a species of beetle in the family Mordellidae. It was described in 1995. It is endemic to Taiwan.

References

Mordellidae
Beetles of Asia
Insects of Taiwan
Endemic fauna of Taiwan
Beetles described in 1995